Kormun or Karmun may refer to:
 Kormun, Hormozgan